Stadionul 1 Mai is a multi-use stadium in Slobozia, Ialomița County. It is currently used mostly for football matches and is the home ground of Unirea Slobozia. It holds 6,000 people, all on seats.

References

Football venues in Romania
Buildings and structures in Ialomița County
Slobozia
1950 establishments in Romania
Sports venues completed in 1950